Pamela Uschuk is an American poet, and 2011 Visiting Poet at University of Tennessee.  She won a 2010 American Book Award, for Crazy Love: New Poems.

Life
Born in 1953 and raised on a farm in Michigan, she received her B.A. In English (cum laude) from Central Michigan University.
She graduated from the University of Montana with a MFA in Poetry and Fiction.

Uschuk has taught creative writing at Marist College, Pacific Lutheran University, Fort Lewis College, the University of Arizona, Salem College, where she was also Director of the Center for Women Writers, Fort Lewis College, Durango, Colorado, where she was Associate Professor of Creative Writing.

She has also taught at Greenhaven Maximum Security Prison for Men in upstate New York  and in Indigenous schools on the Salish, Sioux, Assiniboine, Northern Cheyenne, Flathead, Blackfeet, Crow, Tohono O'odham and Yaqui nations.

Uschuk leads poetry workshops across the country. She is on the faculty at Ghost Ranch Jan Term, where she teaches a three-week mixed-genre writing intensive.  She teaches creative writing classes at the University of Arizona's Poetry Center.

Her literary prizes include The American Book Award (Crazy Love, Wings Press, 2010), the Dorothy Daniels Writing Award from the American League of PEN Women, Simi Valley, the King's English Poetry Prize, the New Millennium Poetry Prize, the Iris Poetry Prize, The Ronald H. Bayes Poetry Prize, and the Tucson/Pima Literature Prize (FINDING PEACHES IN THE DESERT), winningwriters War Poetry Prize and  Struga Poetry Prize for a theme poem.  She has also won awards and honors from the Chester H. Jones Foundation, Wildwood Journal, and Amnesty International.

Her work has been translated into over a dozen languages, and it appears over 300 journals and anthologies worldwide, including Agni, American Voice, Asheville Poetry Review, Nimrod, Parabola, Parnassus, Ploughshares, Poetry, and Southeast Review.

Uschuk was the judge for the 2012 Naugatuck River Review Narrative Poetry Prize.

She married poet William Pitt Root; they live in Tucson, Arizona.  During the summer, they hike and kayak near Durango, Colorado.

Works
 
 Blood Flower, Wings Press, 2015, 
 "Wild In The Plaza of Memory," Wings Press, 2012, 
 Crazy Love: New Poems, Wings Press, 2009, 
 Heartbeats in Stones Codhill Press, 2005, 
 Scattered Risks Wings Press, 2005, 
 One-Legged Dancer Wings Press, 2002, 
 Finding Peaches in the Desert Wings Press, 2000, 
 
 Without Birds, Without Flowers, Without Trees, Flume Press, 1990, 
 Light From Dead Stars. Full Count. 1981.

In Anthology
 
  Continental Drift, editor, Drucilla Wall, publisher University of Nebraska Press, 2017.

Edited
Cutthroat, a Journal of the Arts, 2008, Volume 4, Issue 1, 
"Cutthroat, a Journal of the Arts," 2011, Volume 12, Issue 1, 
THE BEST OF CUTTHROAT, VOLUME 20, Issue 1
TRUTH TO POWER:  WRITERS RESPOND TO THE RHETORIC OF HATE AND FEAR, 2017

References

External links
 "Pam Uschuk ~ interviewed by Derek Alger", Pif Magazine, March 13, 2009
 "Pam Uschuk", Wings Press

 https://pamelauschuk.com
 Black Earth Institute – Fellow

Living people
University of Montana alumni
Central Michigan University alumni
Writers from Lansing, Michigan
University of Tennessee people
Poets from Michigan
American women poets
20th-century American poets
Marist College faculty
Pacific Lutheran University faculty
Fort Lewis College faculty
University of Arizona faculty
Salem College faculty
21st-century American poets
21st-century American women writers
20th-century American women writers
American Book Award winners
Year of birth missing (living people)
American women academics